Carinthia University of Applied Sciences (Fachhochschule Kärnten) is a college of higher education in Carinthia, Austria. The Carinthia University of Applied Sciences was established in 1995 and has four campuses in Carinthia: Feldkirchen, Klagenfurt, Spittal/Drau and Villach.

References

External links
 

Education in Carinthia (state)
Villach
Universities and colleges in Austria